Myronides was an Athenian general of the First Peloponnesian War. In 458 BC he defeated the Corinthians at Megara and then in 457 BC he defeated the Boeotians at the Battle of Oenophyta. Myronides' victory at Oenophyta led to a decade of Athenian domination over Boeotia, Locris and Phocis sometimes called the Athenian 'Land Empire'.

It has been debated, but it is unlikely he was the same Myronides who was sent to Sparta with Cimon and Xanthippus and who served as general at the Battle of Plataea.

References
 Adkins, Lesley, and Roy A. Adkins. "Myronides." Handbook to Life in Ancient Greece, Updated Edition.

Ancient Athenian generals
5th-century BC Athenians
Year of birth unknown
Year of death unknown